Harmony Grass were a British sunshine pop group, briefly active in the late 1960s.

Career

The group was formed in Essex by previous members of Tony Rivers & the Castaways, including Rivers himself. They signed to RCA Records about a year after they formed, and their single "Move in a Little Closer" hit No. 24 on the UK Singles Chart in January 1969. They released one album, This Is Us, in 1969, on the RCA label, and performed in the UK, including at London's Marquee Club, but had broken up by 1970.

Band members Tony Ferguson (guitar) and Kenny Rowe (bass) both joined Capability Brown in 1973.  Rivers (lead vocals) later appeared on albums by Brian Bennett (of The Shadows), Steve Harley & Cockney Rebel, and Roger Daltrey and Tom Marshall then worked with Episode Six, Sparrow, Liquid Gold, Bucks Fizz and Elaine Paige.

References

English pop music groups
Musical groups disestablished in 1970
RCA Records artists
Sunshine pop